Jason Birch is a scholar of medieval hatha yoga and a founding member of SOAS's Centre for Yoga Studies.

Biography 

Jason Birch gained his bachelor's degree in Sanskrit and Hindi at the University of Sydney. He won a Clarendon Scholarship to attend Balliol College, Oxford to study the Amanaska, the earliest rāja yoga text, under Alexis Sanderson. He completed his DPhil there in 2013. In 2014 he joined the Oxford Centre for Hindu Studies as a research fellow. From 2015 he took part in the five-year Haṭha Yoga Project at SOAS University of London, where he has been translating and editing Sanskrit texts on haṭha yoga and rāja yoga. He is a founding member of SOAS's Centre for Yoga Studies. 

His partner is the yoga scholar-practitioner Jacqueline Hargreaves, co-founder of the open-access platform for yoga research The Luminescent, and a founding member of the peer-reviewed Journal of Yoga Studies.

Works

Articles

Book chapters

References

External links 

 
 Interview about the Hatha Yoga Project

Yoga scholars